Jaroslav Krombholc (Prague, 30 January 1918 - 16 July 1983) was a Czechoslovak conductor.

Biography
Krombholc is born in a musician family. He studied in Prague Conservatory in 1937-1940 and nearby Václav Talich until 1942. After, he became conductor and director of different theatres.
He made various recordings of Czech operas for Supraphon, notably Janáček's Káťa Kabanová, and Martinů's Julietta. He was succeeded as chief conductor and director of the National Theatre, Prague by Václav Talich.

His wife was the soprano Maria Tauberová.

External links

References

Czech conductors (music)
Male conductors (music)
1918 births
1983 deaths
20th-century conductors (music)
20th-century Czech male musicians
Czechoslovak conductors (music)